The 1994 Gerry Weber Open was a men's tennis tournament played on outdoor grass courts. It was the 2nd edition of the Gerry Weber Open, and was part of the World Series of the 1994 ATP Tour. It took place at the Gerry Weber Stadion in Halle, North Rhine-Westphalia, Germany, from 13 June until 20 June 1994. First-seeded Michael Stich won the singles title.

Finals

Singles

 Michael Stich defeated  Magnus Larsson 6–4, 4–6, 6–3
It was Stich's 3rd singles title of the year and the 16th of his career.

Doubles

 Olivier Delaître /  Guy Forget defeated  Henri Leconte /  Gary Muller 6–4, 6–7, 6–4

It was Delaitre's 2nd title of the year and the 4th of his career. It was Forget's first title of the year and the 35th of his career.

References

External links
 Official website 
 ITF tournament edition details